The 1998 Railway Cup Hurling Championship was the 70th staging of the Railway Cup since its establishment by the Gaelic Athletic Association in 1927. The cup began on 8 November 1998 and ended on 22 November 1998.

Munster were the defending champions, however, they were beaten by Leinster in the semi-final.

On 22 November 1998, Leinster won the cup after a 0-16 to 2–09 defeat of Connacht in the final at Nowlan Park. This was their 21st Railway Cup title overall and their first title since 1993.

Results

Semi-finals

Final

Bibliography

 Donegan, Des, The Complete Handbook of Gaelic Games (DBA Publications Limited, 2005).

References

Railway Cup Hurling Championship
Railway Cup Hurling Championship
Hurling